This is a list of African-American newspapers that have been published in the state of Missouri.  It includes both current and historical newspapers. 

The first known African-American newspaper in Missouri was the Welcome Friend of St. Louis, which was in circulation by 1870. Yet the first surviving issue of any such newspaper dates from 20 years later in 1890, when the sole surviving issue of The American Negro of Springfield was published. 

At least 64 African-American newspapers have been published in Missouri over the years, although the actual number is likely to be much higher. Of that 64, 55 were established between 1875 and 1920. Most of the publishing activity has been concentrated in the St. Louis and Kansas City metropolitan areas, but many smaller cities and towns have had such newspapers as well.

Notable current African-American newspapers in Missouri include the St. Louis Sentinel, St. Louis American, and Kansas City Globe.

Newspapers

See also 
List of African-American newspapers and media outlets
List of African-American newspapers in Arkansas
List of African-American newspapers in Illinois
List of African-American newspapers in Iowa
List of African-American newspapers in Kansas
List of African-American newspapers in Nebraska
List of African-American newspapers in Oklahoma
List of African-American newspapers in Tennessee
List of newspapers in Missouri

Works cited

References 

Newspapers
Missouri
African-American
African-American newspapers